David Abramovich Dragunsky (– 12 October 1992) was a tank officer in World War II who was twice awarded the title Hero of the Soviet Union.

Early life
After completing school in Novozybkov he became a construction worker. As a member of the Komsomol he was made head of a district council and later sent to rural areas to participate in collectivization. He became a member of the Communist Party in 1931 and was drafted into the military in 1933.

Military career 
In 1938, he commanded an infantry company during combat operations near Khasan Lake and was awarded an Order of the Red Banner. During World War II, he was in command of a Tank battalion and, in 1943, he became the commander of the 55th Guards Tank Brigade of the 3rd Guards Tank Army. Between 1960 and 1965, he commanded the 7th Guards Army.

Politics 
He became an ordinary member of the Communist Party of the Soviet Union in 1931, a member of the Regimental Party Committee in 1935, and Secretary of the Brigade Committee in 1942. He became a Candidate Member of the Central Committee of the CPSU in 1974 and a full member in 1979. In 1983, he was designated chairman of the newly-formed Anti-Zionist Committee of the Soviet Public by the Ideological Department of the CPSU Central Committee and the KGB.

References

Bibliography
 
 
 
 

1910 births
1992 deaths
People from Bryansk Oblast
People from Chernigov Governorate
Russian Jews
Heroes of the Soviet Union
Recipients of the Order of the Red Banner
Jewish socialists
Soviet Jews in the military
Soviet colonel generals
Soviet military personnel of World War II
Tank commanders
Recipients of the Order of Suvorov, 2nd class
Recipients of the Order of Friendship of Peoples
Commanders with Star of the Order of Polonia Restituta
Officers of the Order of Polonia Restituta
Recipients of the Czechoslovak War Cross
Recipients of the Patriotic Order of Merit
Military Academy of the General Staff of the Armed Forces of the Soviet Union alumni
Jewish anti-Zionism in Russia
Jewish anti-Zionism in the Soviet Union